Walter Weldon developed a process in the chlorine production process for reuse of manganese by treating the manganese chloride with milk of lime and blowing air through the mixture to form a precipitation of manganese known as Weldon mud which was used to generate more chlorine.

Chlorine